Gazipur may refer to several places:

 Gazipur, a city in Bangladesh
 Gazipur District, Bangladesh
 Gazipur, Barisal Division, Bangladesh 
 Gazipur, Chittagong Division, Bangladesh
 Gazipur, Jalandhar, village in Punjab, India
 Gazipur, Munger district, village in Bihar, India
 Gazipur, Nalanda district, village in Bihar, India

See also
 Ghazipur (disambiguation)
 Ghazipur